Sar Mala (also Romanized as Sar Malā; also known as Sarmolleh) is a village in Khesht Rural District, Khesht District, Kazerun County, Fars Province, Iran. At the 2006 census, its population was 62, in 15 families.

References 

Populated places in Kazerun County